Geneton Moraes Neto (13 July 1956 – 22 August 2016) was a Brazilian journalist and writer from Pernambuco.

Neto worked as a journalist for over 40 years in print and television. Among other roles, he was a correspondent for O Estado de São Paulo and a prominent figure at GloboNews, where he edited Jornal Nacional.

Neto's book , first published in 1997, is a series of interviews with former presidents of Brazil.

He died of an aortic aneurysm.

Notes

Further reading 
  A 2019 biography of Neto.

External links
 
 Column on G1 Portal 

1956 births
2016 deaths
Brazilian journalists
People from Recife
20th-century Brazilian writers
21st-century Brazilian writers